The Colby School District is a public school district in Clark and Marathon counties in the U.S. state of Wisconsin, based in Colby, Wisconsin. The district operates one elementary school, one middle school and one high school, all within Colby city limits.

Schools
The Colby School District has one preschool, one elementary school, one middle school, and one high school.

Preschools
Little Stars Preschool

Elementary schools 
Colby Elementary School
Principal: Steve Kolden (Superintendent)
Co-Principal: Brenda Medenwaldt

Middle schools
Colby Middle School
Principal: Jim Hagen

High school
Colby High School
Principal: Marcia Diedrich

References

External links

School districts in Wisconsin
Education in Clark County, Wisconsin
Education in Marathon County, Wisconsin